Hélène Christine Marie Rigoine de Fougerolles (born 25 February 1973) is a French actress who was twice nominated for the César Award for Most Promising Actress (known as the French Oscar) for Arthur Joffé's Let There Be Light (1998) and Jacques Rivette's Va savoir (2001) for which she was also awarded the Prix Romy Schneider. de Fougerolles spent the first phase of her career in auteur cinema appearing in such films as Jean-Pierre Mocky's Le Mari de Léon (1992), Patrice Chéreau's La Reine Margot (1994), Cédric Klapisch's Le Péril jeune (1994), Philippe Harel's The Story of a Boy Who Wanted to Be Kissed alongside Marion Cotillard, Mathieu Kassovitz's Assassin(s) (1997) or Baltasar Kormákur's The Sea (2002). She played Madame de Pompadour twice, in Fanfan la Tulipe (2003) alongside Penélope Cruz and Robin Davis' Jeanne Poisson (2006). As of 2021, she has starred in more than 60 cinema, television and stage productions and her book T'inquiète pas, maman, ça va aller (2021) about her daughter's autism is published throughout the french-speaking world.

Early life

De Fougerolles was born on 25 February 1973 in Vannes, Morbihan, France and spent years of her childhood in Guadeloupe. The daughter of wine salesman Alain Rigoine de Fougerolles and breton sailing publicist Anne Saumay de Laval. Her parents divorced when she was three. Through her mother Anne Saumay de Laval, de Fougerolles is a descendant of Gilles de Rais, knight and lord from Brittany, Anjou and Poitou and companion-in-arms of Joan of Arc believed to be the inspiration for Charles Perrault's Bluebeard (1697). She was initially planning to become a beautician, but she began to study acting at age 15. She later attended acting classes in Paris and briefly attending the Lee Strasberg Institute in New York City.

Personal life
De Fougerolles was married to Éric Hubert in 1997 and they have a daughter, born in 2003. The couple later divorced in 2004. She is vegan.

Career

In 1999, de Fougerolles auditioned for Danny Boyle's The Beach to act alongside Leonardo DiCaprio but casting directors immediately told her that she was not mysterious enough as she arrived with blond hair in pigtails. She asked them if she could "be an extra or serve coffees there, three months in thailand, it sounds idyllic!". Although firstly reticent because the actress was already established in the industry, they finally accepted. As journalists were not allowed to come take pictures on set, the only picture the press could have of Guillaume Canet and Virginie Ledoyen before shooting started, was their departure at Paris airport with de Fougerolles. They made it the cover of Studio Magazine from which the international press reported her as officially cast. This eventually lended her lines edited out of the final cut but present in the dvd extras.

She made her first ever theatrical stage appearance in Occupe-toi d'Amélie! alongside Bruno Putzulu at the Théâtre de la Michodière in Paris from September 2012 to May 2013.

Filmography

Theatre

Occupe-toi d'Amélie (2012) - Théâtre de la Michodière

Awards and nominations
 2001: Romy Schneider Award
 2002: Nominated – César Award for Most Promising Young Actress

References

External links

 

1973 births
Living people
French film actresses
French stage actresses
French television actresses
People from Vannes
20th-century French actresses
21st-century French actresses